Kahibah was an electoral district of the Legislative Assembly in the Australian state of New South Wales created in 1894 with the abolition of multi-member districts from part of the electoral district of Newcastle and named after the Newcastle suburb of Kahibah. It was abolished in 1920, with the introduction of proportional representation. It was recreated in 1927 and abolished and partly replaced by Waratah in 1930. It was recreated in 1950 and abolished again in 1971 and replaced by Charlestown.

Members for Kahibah

Election results

References

Former electoral districts of New South Wales
1894 establishments in Australia
Constituencies established in 1894
1920 disestablishments in Australia
Constituencies disestablished in 1920
1927 establishments in Australia
Constituencies established in 1927
1930 disestablishments in Australia
Constituencies disestablished in 1930
1950 establishments in Australia
Constituencies established in 1950
1971 disestablishments in Australia
Constituencies disestablished in 1971